Frazer John Blake-Tracy (born 10 September 1995) is an English professional footballer who plays as a left back for Swindon Town.

Career

Non-League career
Blake-Tracy made 46 appearances for Dereham Town in the 2015–16 season before moving to then Ryman Premier side Lowestoft Town on 4 July 2016. 
Blake-Tracy signed for King's Lynn Town in the summer of 2017. He went on to make 98 appearances in all competitions, scoring 2 goals.

Peterborough United
On 1 July 2019, EFL League One side Peterborough United signed Blake-Tracy on a 2-year deal. The left-back made his debut away to Oxford United on 10 August, replacing Dan Butler at half time. On 11 May 2021 it was announced that he would leave the club at the end of his contract.

Burton Albion
On 18 June 2021 it was announced that he would sign for Burton Albion following the expiry of his Peterborough contract on 1 July.

Swindon Town
In August 2022 he moved on loan to Swindon Town. The transfer was made permanent in January 2023.

Career statistics

References

1995 births
Living people
English footballers
Association football fullbacks
Dereham Town F.C. players
Lowestoft Town F.C. players
King's Lynn Town F.C. players
Peterborough United F.C. players
Burton Albion F.C. players
Swindon Town F.C. players
English Football League players